Wittrockia cyathiformis is a plant species in the genus Wittrockia.

The bromeliad is endemic to the Atlantic Forest biome (Mata Atlantica Brasileira), located in southeastern Brazil.

References

cyathiformis
Endemic flora of Brazil
Flora of the Atlantic Forest
Flora of Bahia
Flora of Espírito Santo
Flora of Minas Gerais
Flora of Paraná (state)
Flora of Rio de Janeiro (state)
Flora of Santa Catarina (state)
Flora of São Paulo (state)